Stepping Out is the debut studio album by Canadian singer Diana Krall, released in 1993 by Justin Time Records. It has since been reissued several times on Justin Time, as Stepping Out: The Early Recordings on GRP Records, and as a vinyl record through Barnes & Noble.

Track listing

 Note: early editions omit On the Sunny Side of the Street meaning those copies have a running time of 54:15.

Personnel
Credits adapted from the liner notes of the 2000 reissue of Stepping Out.

Studios
 Kingsound Studios (North Hollywood, California) – recording 
 Group IV Recording Studios (Hollywood, California) – recording 
 Studio Tempo (Montreal) – mixing

Musicians
 Diana Krall – vocals, piano ; arrangements 
 John Clayton – bass
 Jeff Hamilton – drums
 Ahmad Jamal – arrangements 
 Klaus Suonsaari – arrangements 
 Redd Evans – arrangements

Technical
 Jim West – production
 Ian Terry – engineering ; mixing, digital remastering 
 Eddy King – engineering assistance 
 Hank Cicalo – engineering 
 Rick Winquest – engineering assistance 
 Denis Cadieux – mixing assistance
 Renée Marc-Aurèle – digital remastering

Artwork
 Les Paparazzi – photography
 Michael Slobodian – photography
 Graphic Junction – design
 Ray Brown – liner notes

Charts

Weekly charts

Year-end charts

Certifications

References

External links
 

1993 debut albums
Covers albums
Diana Krall albums
Justin Time Records albums